The Danube Express is a private train operating in central and eastern Europe. It provides a hotel-on-wheels service with sleeping cars of three comfort categories (Superior DeLuxe, DeLuxe and Heritage classes), completed by restaurant, lounge and staff cars. Its operating season is generally from April to October.

The operation of the train has begun in September 2008. Most of the journeys were organized from Budapest to Istanbul via Romania and Bulgaria, and return via Serbia, but there were also frequent tours to Austria, Slovakia, Poland, the Czech Republic and Germany. 

Since 2014 the train belongs to Golden Eagle Luxury Trains, who has extended the range of tours significantly. Journeys have taken part until 2016 even to and inside Iran, and from Istanbul to Venice through the Balkan states, but since then all the tours to and via Turkey are cancelled due to safety reasons. New tours were made in the recent years through Italy - down to Sicily and via Switzerland.

Rolling stock

Some of the cars were also previously operated on its predecessor train Royal Hungarian Express.

The carriages are based in Budapest, Hungary, and operated by MÁV Nosztalgia Ltd..

Train composition may vary upon demand between 7 and 13 carriages. There are no specific engines for the haulage, but in Hungary - at least at the departures and arrivals from/to Budapest - it's done particularly by heritage (even steam) locomotives.

Tours

See also
List of named passenger trains of Europe

References

External links 
Danube Express, Official website
mavnosztalgia.

International named passenger trains